Mibuchi is a Japanese surname. Notable people with the surname include:

, Japanese judge
, Japanese lawyer

Japanese-language surnames